Johnny Bonnar (11 January 1924 – 14 January 2004) was a Scottish footballer, who played as a goalkeeper for Arbroath, Celtic, Dumbarton and St Johnstone.

Bonnar signed for Celtic from Arbroath on 9 August 1948 and made his league debut in the 4–0 victory over Clyde on 6 November that year. Despite playing second (and even third fiddle) he was given his back chance on Hogmany 1949 when Willie Miller was injured and it was Bonnar and not Alex Devanny given the nod to play. He was soon heralded as "Celtic's best since John Thomson". Although small, Bonnar was agile enough to make over a century of league appearances for Celtic, and over 200 appearances altogether. Bonnar was not particularly tall for a goalkeeper but was able to produce moments of magic. He was Celtic's goalkeeper and hero in the 1953 Coronation Cup final against Hibs, where he kept their Famous Five forward line at bay, it is considered to be one of the best performances ever by a Celtic goalkeeper. Bonnar achieved 49 clean sheets in his 180 competitive appearances for Celtic.

In 1954 he played his part in a league and Scottish Cup double for Celtic. Additionally, in 1954 he made four world-class saves against Partick Thistle on 20 March to help Celtic to the points on the road to a league title win. This adds to the affection the support from the time had for him. Bonnar moved to Dumbarton in 1958 - he had lost his place in the first team to Dick Beattie three years earlier and had made only sporadic appearances thereafter. After his spell at Dumbarton, Bonnar left the game to concentrate on business interests. However, St Johnstone managed to entice him back, where he helped the club win promotion for the first time. Bonnar was also one of the founders of the Celtic's original development fund during the 1960s and was in charge of organising the Fund during that period.

Quotations 

 -- Charlie Tully

References 

Celtic: A complete record 1888-1992 by Paul Lunney

External links 

1924 births
2004 deaths
Footballers from West Lothian
Association football goalkeepers
Scottish footballers
Scottish Football League players
Arbroath F.C. players
Celtic F.C. players
Dumbarton F.C. players
St Johnstone F.C. players